Natalie Diaz (born September 4, 1978) is a Pulitzer Prize-winning Mojave American poet, language activist, former professional basketball player, and educator. She is enrolled in the Gila River Indian Community and identifies as Akimel O'odham. She is currently an Associate Professor at Arizona State University.

Early life
Natalie Diaz was born in Needles, California on Sep. 4. 1978 . She grew up in the Fort Mojave Indian Village in Needles, California, on the border of California, Arizona, and Nevada. She attended Old Dominion University, where she played point guard on the women's basketball team, reaching the NCAA Final Four as a freshman and the bracket of sixteen her other three years. She earned a bachelor's degree. After playing professional basketball in Europe and Asia, she returned to Old Dominion University, and completed an MFA in poetry and fiction, in 2006.

Career
Her work appeared in Narrative, Poetry magazine, Drunken Boat, Prairie Schooner, Iowa Review, and Crab Orchard Review.

Diaz's debut book of poetry, When My Brother Was an Aztec, "portrays experiences rooted in Native American life with personal and mythic power." It was a 2012 Lannan Literary Selection, was shortlisted for the 2013 PEN/Open Book Award, and was a 2013 American Book Award winner. One important focus of the book is a sister struggling with her brother's addiction to crystal meth.

In 2012, she was interviewed about her poetry and language rehabilitation work on the PBS News Hour.

In 2018, she was named as the Maxine and Jonathan Marshall Chair in Modern and Contemporary Poetry at Arizona State University.

In 2019, she was faculty at the CantoMundo Retreat.

In 2021, her book Postcolonial Love Poem won the Pulitzer Prize for Poetry. It was called "a collection of tender, heart-wrenching and defiant poems that explore what it means to love and be loved in an America beset by conflict." The book was also a finalist for the 2020 National Book Award, a finalist for the 2020 Los Angeles Times Book Prize, a finalist for the 2020 Forward Prize for Best Collection, and shortlisted for the 2020 T. S. Eliot Prize.

Personal life
Diaz currently lives in Mohave Valley, Arizona where she used to work on language revitalization at Fort Mojave, her home reservation. She worked with the last Elder speakers of the Mojave language. She is enrolled as member of the Gila Indian Community.

Poetry

In anthology
 Kurt Schweigman and Lucille Lang Day, eds. (2016). Red Indian Road West: Native American Poetry from California. Scarlet Tanager Books.

Awards and honors 

|-
| 2007
| No More Cake Here
|Pablo Neruda Prize in Poetry
|
|-
| 2007
| The Hooferman
|Tobias Wolff Fiction Prize
|
|-
| 2012
| Poetry Fellow
|Lannan Literary Fellowship
|
|-
| 2012
| Downhill Triolets
|Narrative Prize
|
|-
| 2012
| Poetry Scholar
|Louis Untermeyer Scholarship in Poetry
|
|-
| 2015
| Writing Fellow
| PEN/Civitella Ranieri Foundation Fellowship
| 
|-
| 2018
| Poetry Fellow
| MacArthur Fellowship
|
|-
| 2021
| Postcolonial Love Poem
| Pulitzer Prize for Poetry
| 
|}

References

External links

 Natalie Diaz, Blue Flower Arts
  Natalie Diaz poems, Academy of American Poets

1978 births
Living people
American Book Award winners
American women's basketball players
American women poets
MacArthur Fellows
Native American poets
Native American women writers
Old Dominion Monarchs women's basketball players
21st-century Native American women
21st-century Native Americans
Native American basketball players
Poets from California
Basketball players from California
People from Needles, California
Native American sportswomen